Lyogyrus is a genus of very small freshwater snails with a gill and an operculum, aquatic gastropod mollusks in the family Hydrobiidae.

Species 
Species within the genus Lyogyrus include:
 Lyogyrus granum
 Lyogyrus greggi (Hershler, date unknown) - Rocky Mountain duskysnail

References

 Nomenclator Zoologicus info

Hydrobiidae